Federica Manzon (born Pordenone, 2 October 1981) is an Italian writer. She was the recipient of the Rapallo Carige Prize for Di fama e di sventura in 2011.

References

Italian women novelists
21st-century Italian women writers
21st-century Italian novelists
People from Pordenone
1981 births
Living people